The McCarthy Road is a gravel-surfaced road that runs from the end of the Edgerton Highway in Chitina, Alaska, to about  outside of McCarthy, Alaska.

Route description

McCarthy Road starts at the end of the Edgerton Highway in Chitina. The road is gravel-surfaced, and often very rough with many washboards and sharp turns. It is one of two roads leading to Wrangell-St. Elias National Park and Preserve, though it is not part of the park, and gives access to the abandoned copper mines at Kennecott. 

The road does not actually lead all the way to Kennecott; visitors must cross the Kennecott River by a footbridge built in the 1990s.  The road is not maintained during winter.

The road was the inspiration for the 2004 book The Road to McCarthy: Around the World in Search of Ireland by Pete McCarthy.

Major intersections

References

External links

 Wrangell-St. Elias National Park visitor information
 Google map of McCarthy road

Copper River Census Area, Alaska
Gravel roads
State highways in Alaska
Transportation in Unorganized Borough, Alaska
Wrangell–St. Elias National Park and Preserve